Nada Cristofoli (born 6 January 1971) is an Italian former cyclist. She competed in the women's point race at the 1996 Summer Olympics.

References

External links
 

1971 births
Living people
Italian female cyclists
Olympic cyclists of Italy
Cyclists at the 1996 Summer Olympics
Place of birth missing (living people)
People from the Province of Pordenone
Cyclists from Friuli Venezia Giulia
20th-century Italian women
21st-century Italian women